This timeline is a chronology of significant events in the history of the U.S. State of Utah and the historical area now occupied by the state.


2020s

2010s

2000s

1990s

1980s

1970s

1960s

1950s

1940s

1930s

1920s

1910s

1900s

1890s

1880s

1870s

1860s

1850s

1840s

1830s

1820s

1810s

1790s

1780s

1770s

1760s

1690s

1590s

1510s

1490s

Before 1492

See also

History of Utah
Government of Utah
History of African Americans in Utah
History of the Colorado Plateau
History of the Rocky Mountains
Indigenous peoples of the North American Southwest
List of counties in Utah
List of ghost towns in Utah
List of governors of Utah
List of municipalities in Utah
Paleontology in Utah
Prehistory of Utah
Southwestern archaeology
Territorial evolution of Utah
State of Utah
Territory of Utah

References
References are included in the linked articles.

External links

Timeline of Utah history
Timeline of Utah history
Timelines of states of the United States
United States history timelines